State Coach may refer to:

Australia 
 Australian State Coach

Austria 
 Imperial Coach

United Kingdom 
 1902 State Landau
 Diamond Jubilee State Coach
 Glass Coach
 Gold State Coach 
 Lord Mayor of London's State Coach
 Queen Alexandra's State Coach
 Scottish State Coach
 Irish State Coach 
 Speaker's State Coach